The Warragamba River, a river that is part of the Hawkesbury-Nepean catchment, is located in the Macarthur region of New South Wales, Australia.

Course and features

Prior to the creation of Lake Burragorang, the Warragamba River would have been formed by the confluences of the Coxs, Nattai, and Wollondilly rivers in the Burragorang Valley. It was this configuration which allowed a relatively short but high dam wall in the gorge to impound a large quantity of water.

The area surrounding Warragamba River is managed by Sydney Catchment Authority under the  that defines special zones and places restrictions and controls on land use, development and access in order to safeguard potable water.

Popular Culture 

 A popular phrase used throughout greater Sydney Australia is Warragamba Slammer. This refers to a glass of water, which is used in pubs and restaurants.

See also 

 List of rivers of New South Wales (L–Z)
 List of rivers of Australia
 Rivers of New South Wales
 Warragamba Dam

References

External links
 

Rivers of New South Wales
Southern Highlands (New South Wales)
Hawkesbury River
Warragamba, New South Wales
Wollondilly Shire